Edna Pendleton (born 1887) was an American film actress. She played Aronnax's Daughter in 20,000 Leagues Under the Sea (1916), starring Allen Holubar and Dan Hanlon.

Filmography
 20,000 Leagues Under the Sea (1916) as Aronnax's Daughter
 The Girl Who Feared Daylight (1916) as Viola Dexter
 Held for Damages (1916) as Peggy O'Brien
 Mignonette (1916) as Mignon
 The Still Voice (1916) as Margaret Hamlin
 Artistic Interference (1916) as Ethel Miller
 The Curious Conduct of Judge Legarde (1915) as Amelia Garside
 The Girl I Left Behind Me (1915)

References

External links
 
 

1887 births
American silent film actresses
20th-century American actresses
Year of death missing